The 2015–16 VfB Stuttgart season was the 123rd season in the club's football history. In 2015–16, the club played in the Bundesliga, the premier tier of German football.

Squad

Out on loan

Transfers

Transferred in

Transferred out

Competitions

Bundesliga

League table

Results summary

Results by round

Matches

DFB-Pokal

References

VfB Stuttgart
VfB Stuttgart seasons